Iowa Foundation for Medical Care (IFMC) is a taxpayer-funded, non-profit organization which provides services in health care quality improvement and medical information management. IFMC is based in West Des Moines, Iowa and has offices in Illinois, Maryland and Oklahoma. The company holds the Medicare Quality Improvement Organizations (QIO) contracts for Iowa and Illinois. As of 2007, IFMC was by far the largest of the 53 taxpayer-funded QIOs in the United States.

IFMC's nearly 800 employees and associates strive to carry out the company's mission:  "We optimize the quality of medical care and health through collaborative relationships, education, and health information management."

IFMC business units 
ENCOMPASS Health Management Systems 
IFMC Health Care Quality Programs 
IFMC - IL
IFMC Information Systems

References

External links
Official site https://web.archive.org/web/20051014234558/http://www.ifmc.org/ 
 http://encompassonline.com

Health care companies based in Iowa
Quality Improvement Organizations in Medicare
West Des Moines, Iowa